Kukutin is a settlement in Kiribati.

this is an abandoned settlement and the atoll the settlement was once on is now part of the Phoenix Islands laying halfway between Hawaii and Australia

See also
 Arariki

References

Populated places in Kiribati